Olle Ludvigsson (born 26 April 1948) is a Swedish politician who served as a Member of the European Parliament (MEP) from 2009 until 2019. He is a member of the Swedish Social Democratic Party, part of the Party of European Socialists.

In addition to his committee assignments, Ludvigsson served as a member of the European Parliament Intergroup on Western Sahara.

References

External links
Profile at the website of the Swedish Social Democratic Party
Ludvigsson's account on Twitter

1948 births
Living people
Swedish Social Democratic Party MEPs
MEPs for Sweden 2009–2014
MEPs for Sweden 2014–2019